BBC Radio 1 Live in Concert is a 1992 live album by Echo & the Bunnymen. It was recorded by the BBC during the band's concert at the Liverpool Empire Theatre on 11 January 1988 and broadcast on BBC Radio 1's In Concert programme.

Track listing 
 "Rescue" – 3.52
 "Heaven Up Here" – 3.25
 "With a Hip" – 2.43
 "Bombers Bay" – 4.27
 "All I Want" – 3.50
 "Back of Love" – 3.00
 "Crocodiles" – 4.02
 "Zimbo" – 4.02
 "Seven Seas" – 2.49
 "Bedbugs and Ballyhoo" – 2.51
 "The Cutter" – 3.30
 "Show of Strength" – 4.22
 "Lips Like Sugar" – 5.10
 "Thorn of Crowns" – 5.26

Personnel 
 Ian McCulloch – singer, guitar
 Will Sergeant – guitar
 Les Pattinson – bass guitar
 Pete de Freitas – drums

References 

 Discogs.com

BBC Radio recordings
Echo & the Bunnymen live albums
1992 live albums